Music & Media was a pan-European magazine for radio, music and entertainment. It was published for the first time in 1984 as Eurotipsheet, but in 1986 it changed name to Music & Media. It was originally based in Amsterdam, but later moved to London. The magazine focused specifically on radio, TV, music, charts and related areas of entertainment such as music festivals and events. Music & Media ceased in August 2003. Music & Media was the sister publication of Billboard magazine.

Record charts
Main charts
European Top 100 Albums (sales)
European Hot 100 Singles (sales)
European Airplay Top 50 (airplay) (previously called European Hit Radio Top 40)
European Border Breakers (airplay of European songs breaking out of their country of signing)

Awards 
The publication presented the Pan European Awards, later called Music & Media Year End Awards. Winners were selected by the European Music Report, recognizing artists with the "greatest sales achievements" in Europe throughout the year, based on the sales and chart performance of artists on the European Hot 100 and European Top 100 Albums, as well as the European Airplay Top 50 beginning in 1990. Some of the first-decade perennial winners were Michael Jackson, Bruce Springsteen and Madonna, with the lattermost receiving the special Eurochart Artist of The Decade in 1994, for her continued success in all of their chart formats. According to a 1985 report, presentations of the trophee to the artists were filmed in some European TV programs.

Music & Media also presented the DJ Awards, where winners were chosen by DJs, producers and programme directors from private and state ratio stations all over Europe.

References

External links
 Music & Media Archive on Americanradiohistory.com

Listings magazines
Magazines about the media
Magazines established in 1984
Magazines disestablished in 2009
Magazines published in London
Magazines published in Amsterdam
Professional and trade magazines
Weekly magazines published in the United Kingdom
Defunct magazines published in the United Kingdom
European music charts